Patriarch Mark may refer to:

 Patriarch Mark I of Alexandria, ruled in 43–68
 Mark II of Constantinople, Ecumenical Patriarch in 1465–1466
 Patriarch Mark III of Alexandria, Greek Patriarch of Alexandria in 1180–1209
 Patriarch Mark IV of Alexandria, Greek Patriarch of Alexandria in 1385–1389
 Patriarch Mark V of Alexandria, Greek Patriarch of Alexandria in 1425–1435
 Patriarch Mark VI of Alexandria, Greek Patriarch of Alexandria in 1459–1484